is a Panamanian footballer who plays as a midfielder.

Career

Youth and college career
In 2014, he was selected to the 28 finalist of "Nike Chance" Japan round. He moved to the United States to attend Barton Community College, making 25 appearances and scoring 7 goals in two seasons for the Cougars. In 2015, he transferred to Florida Gulf Coast University, where he played for the Eagles until 2016, scoring twice in 31 appearances.

Amateur clubs
Barriga Toyama appeared for the Brooklyn Italians between 2014 and 2015, and managed to score a goal in the 2014 U.S. Open Cup against Jersey Express S.C. In 2016, he made two appearances and scored a goal for FC Wichita in the NPSL. In 2017, he made ten appearances in the PDL for K–W United FC. He returned to the NPSL in 2018, making one appearance for Laredo Heat.

Forward Madison FC
After graduating in 2018, Barriga Toyama joined Minnesota United FC on trial during the 2019 pre-season. On 29 January, he scored a hat-trick in a friendly against FC Tucson. Minnesota United opted not to sign him, though he was noticed by the club's affiliate Forward Madison FC. On 5 March 2019, he signed with Madison, joining for the club's inaugural season in USL League One.

Monterey Bay FC
On 1 March 2022, Barriga Toyama made the move to USL Championship side Monterey Bay. His contract option was declined by the club at the end of the season.

Personal life
Barriga Toyama was born in Panama City, Panama, to a Colombian father and Japanese mother. He moved to Japan at the age of 2.

References

External links
 
 
 
 

1995 births
Living people
Sportspeople from Panama City
Panamanian footballers
Japanese footballers
Panamanian people of Japanese descent
Panamanian people of Colombian descent
Japanese people of Colombian descent
Panamanian expatriate footballers
Japanese expatriate footballers
Panamanian expatriate sportspeople in the United States
Japanese expatriate sportspeople in the United States
Expatriate soccer players in the United States
Association football midfielders
Florida Gulf Coast Eagles men's soccer players
Brooklyn Italians players
FC Wichita players
K-W United FC players
Laredo Heat players
Forward Madison FC players
Monterey Bay FC players
National Premier Soccer League players
USL League One players
USL League Two players